Vilsandi Lighthouse (Estonian: Vilsandi tuletorn) is a lighthouse located on the island of Vilsandi (10 km west of the island of Saaremaa), in Estonia. The lighthouse was built in 1809, making it the oldest lighthouse on the coastline of the Baltic Sea in Saare County. In 1907 the lighthouse keeper became Artur Toom, which founded the first protected area in the small island of Vaika. Artur Toom ended his service of lighthouse keeper in 1941. In 1957 the lighthouse was renovated.

See also 

 List of lighthouses in Estonia

References

External links 

 

Lighthouses completed in 1809
Resort architecture in Estonia
Towers completed in 1809
Lighthouses in Estonia
Saaremaa Parish
Buildings and structures in Saare County